Mary Lou Jepsen (born 1965) is a technical executive and inventor in the fields of display, imaging, and computer hardware.  Her contributions have had worldwide adoption in head-mounted display, HDTV, laptop computers, and projector products; she was the technical force behind a generation of low-cost computing, and innovative consumer and medical imaging technologies. She was named one of the hundred most influential people in the world by Time Magazine (Time 100), was named in 2013 to CNN's top 10 thinkers in science and technology for her work in display innovation, and she has over 200 patents published or issued.

She was the co-founder and first chief technology officer of One Laptop per Child (OLPC), and later founded Pixel Qi in Taipei, Taiwan, focused on the design and manufacture of displays. She founded and led two moonshots at Google X, reporting to Sergey Brin, and was an executive at Facebook / Oculus VR, leading an effort to advance virtual reality.

In 2016 she founded OpenWater, a startup working on fMRI-type imaging of the body using holographic, infrared techniques.

Early life and education 
Jepsen studied Studio Art and Electrical Engineering at Brown University. She received a Master of Science in Holography from the MIT Media Lab, and then returned to Brown to receive a Ph.D. in Optical Sciences.

Career 
Her PhD work combined theoretical coupled-wave analysis with lab work, in which she created large-scale, embossed surface-relief diffraction gratings with liquid crystal-filled grooves with high diffraction efficiency in un-polarized illumination.

She has created some of the largest ambient displays ever. In Cologne, Germany she built a holographic replica of pre-existing buildings in the city's historic district and created a holographic display encompassing a city block. She also demonstrated that it was technically feasible – but agreed it was culturally unacceptable – to project TV images on the moon's surface.

From 2003 until the end of 2004, she was the chief technology officer of Intel’s Display Division. In 2016 she joined the board of directors of Lear Corporation, a leading maker of automotive electronics and seating.

MIT Media Lab and OLPC 
In 2005 Jepsen joined the faculty of the MIT Media Lab as a professor with a tenure-track position. Here she started the Nomadic Displays Group, and co-created the first holographic video system in the world in 1989, where the interference structure of the hologram was computed at video rates, and shown on her hand-made display. This system inspired a new subfield of holographic video and received numerous awards.

Working with Nicholas Negroponte, she simultaneously co-founded One Laptop per Child, a $100 computer, the lowest-power laptop ever made. As of 2013, millions of units have shipped to children in the developing world and revenues are beyond the billion dollar mark. There are deployments in over 50 countries and in more than 25 different languages. For the entire first year of the effort (2005) she was the only employee of One Laptop per Child [OLPC]. By the end of 2005, she had completed the initial architecture, led the development of the first prototype, and signed up some of the world's largest manufacturers to produce the XO-1. By the end of 2007 she had led the laptop through development and into high volume mass production. At OLPC, Jepsen invented the laptop's sunlight-readable display technology and co-invented its ultra-low power management system, and transformed these inventions into high volume mass production.

Pixel Qi 

Hooked on the impact that OLPC was having using the massive factory infrastructure of the world, she left Boston to split her time between Silicon Valley and Asia. In 2008 she started a for-profit company, Pixel Qi, to commercialize some of the technologies she invented at OLPC. The firm's business was based on the concept that the screen is the most critical component of any mobile device. It aimed to deliver high performance, low-power, sunlight-readable screens for mobile devices. The long-term vision of Pixel Qi was to create devices that never needed to be recharged by lowering the power consumption and using alternative power generation and battery technologies. Its screens became available in a few dozen commercial and specialized products with sunlight readability, and reduced screen power consumption (which typically accounts for about 90% of the power draw in a tablet, and 70% of the power draw on a standard cell phone.

Google X and virtual reality 
Jepsen joined Google X in 2013. She advised and directed display and consumer electronic programs throughout Google. The Wall Street Journal reported that among her projects there she created Google Lego TV: displays composed of smaller screens that plug together like Legos to create vast, seamless images and "live walls" for wall size interaction, television, video conferencing and gaming, to virtual reality without having to wear anything on your face or body. She was also one of the first contributors in Google's "Solve for X" projects with her idea of "Imaging the Mind's Eye".

In February 2015, she joined Facebook as an executive for virtual reality.

Openwater 
In 2016, she left Facebook and founded Openwater, a firm aiming to use infrared holography to make fMRI-type imaging inside the body practical, at the price level of consumer electronics and in wearable form factors. She gave a talk at 2018 TED on the technology behind the Openwater approach. At the IGNITION 2018 Conference, Jepsen further discussed the resolution progression of Openwater's MRI machines and the potential for the technology to make advancements in telepathy by allowing users to transmit thoughts and feelings electronically.

In a 2020 online call, Mary Lou mentioned that openwater devices are actively in the rapid prototyping phase with alpha kits expected August 2020. The Openwater website stated in 2020: "We are starting hospital studies on humans for use as a stroke detector at the end of 2020." As of 2020, the final devices were slated to come out sometime in 2021.

Awards and recognitions 

 100 most influential people in the world (Time Magazine's "Time 100").
 Canada's online Athatbasca University awarded Jepsen an honorary doctorate in 2008.
 One of 2013's top 10 thinkers (as named by CNN), for her work in rethinking functional brain imaging with compact systems that could lead to direct communication via human thought.
 In 2014 she received an honorary Doctorate of Science from Brown University.
 Edwin H. Land Medal from the Optical Society (OSA).
 Fellow of the Optical Society (OSA).
 One of the top 50 female computer scientists of all time (as determined by the Anita Borg Institute).
 Brown University's top alumni awards: Horace Mann Medal (awarded by Brown Graduate School) and BEAM award (awarded by Brown University School of Engineering).
 2011 ABIE Award for Innovation  from the Anita Borg Institute.
 2018 Forbes' America's Top 50 Women In Tech
She has also received numerous awards for the work she did at One Laptop per Child and has been named to many other "top" lists in computing by Fast Company, New York Times, IEEE Spectrum and others.
Technology Pioneers 2019 (world economic fourm)

Personal life
Jepsen is married to John Patrick Conor Ryan, formerly a partner at Monitor Group. In 1995, she suffered from a pituitary gland tumor and had it removed and thus suffers from panhypopituitarism, requiring a twice-daily regimen of hormone replacement; her personal description of this and the ongoing challenges she faces was published in the New York Times.

References

External links

 
 
 Mary Lou Jepsen on Google Scholar
 Oculus Has Hired Mary Lou Jepsen Away From Google X

1965 births
Living people
American technology chief executives
American technology company founders
American women chief executives
Brown University School of Engineering alumni
American chief technology officers
Massachusetts Institute of Technology alumni
One Laptop per Child
Women chief technology officers
American women company founders
Women inventors
Place of birth missing (living people)
Founders of charities
Fellows of Optica (society)
Women in optics